The 2023 Virginia Tech Hokies football team will represent Virginia Tech as a member of the Atlantic Coast Conference during the 2023 NCAA Division I FBS football season. The Hokies are expected to be led by Brent Pry in his second year as Virginia Tech's head coach. They play their home games at Lane Stadium in Blacksburg, Virginia.

Schedule
Virginia Tech and the ACC announced the 2023 football schedule on January 30, 2023. The 2023 season will be the conference's first season since 2004, that its scheduling format just includes one division. The new format sets Virginia Tech with three set conference opponents, while playing the remaining ten teams twice in an (home and away) in a four–year cycle. The Hokies three set conference opponents for the next four years is; Pittsburgh, Virginia, and Wake Forest.

References

Virginia Tech
Virginia Tech Hokies football seasons
Virginia Tech Hokies football